

Qualification system
A total of sixteen teams per gender qualified to compete at the games. The host nation (Canada) qualified in each event, along with the top five ranked nations in South America and the top ten nations ranked in North, Central America and the Caribbean. The rankings on January 1, 2015 were used to determine the teams.

Qualification summary

Men

North, Central America and the Caribbean

South America

As the host nation Canada, was ranked among the top ten nations, the eleventh nation (Saint Lucia) qualified as well. The Dominican Republic and Costa Rica declined their quotas. Their spots were given to the twelfth and thirteenth nations (Aruba and Nicaragua respective).

Women
North, Central America and the Caribbean

South America

As the host nation Canada, was ranked among the top ten nations, the eleventh nation (Nicaragua) qualified as well. The Dominican Republic declined its quota.

References

P
Qualification for the 2015 Pan American Games
Beach volleyball at the 2015 Pan American Games